Alfonso de Ceballos-Escalera y Gila (born March 4, 1957, in Madrid) is a Spanish aristocrat, who holds the title of Marqués de la Floresta & Viscount of Ayala in the Kingdom of Spain and Duke of Ostuni of the former Kingdom of the Two-Sicilies (Italy).

A lawyer and historian, the Marquess de la Floresta & Viscount of Ayala is the Chronicler of Arms for the Autonomous Community of Castille & Leon. He also has been bestowed with the title of Duke of Ostuni (in the Two Sicilies). The Marquess is author of many books on jurisprudence, history, royalty, nobility, heraldry and genealogy.

He is a retired lieutenant-commander (OF-3) of the Spanish Navy and holds the rank of captain in the Merchant Marine Fleet. He has also been awarded a doctorate in law, a doctorate in political science and a doctorate in history as well as receiving many orders of knighthood.

King of Arms of Spain
The heraldic office of Spanish King of Arms dates back to the 14th century. Historically heralds were accorded titles of office after Iberian provinces or major cities, whilst the Reyes de Armas represented Spanish kingdoms. Accordingly, chroniclers of arms were variously named for España, Castilla, León, Frechas, Sevilla, Córdoba, Murcia, Granada (created in 1496 to honour the reunification of Spain), Bethune, Estella, Viana, Libertat, Blanc Lévrier, Bonne Foy, Las, Gounzcuant, Lamas, Navarra, Cataluña, Sicilia, Aragón, Nápoles, Toledo, Valencia and Mallorca. Such appointments were for life (ad vitam) and at least fifteen Spanish families produced more than one herald over the past five hundred years. His role as King of Arms combines that of formally registering pedigrees and the granting of new armorial bearings. In the past the nature of continuous border conflict between the Moorish and Christian kingdoms of medieval Iberia Peninsula helped to create a sense of ethnic identity, or limpieza de sangre, and heraldry was a significant outlet for expressing national identity; attempts from time to time were made to make arms distinctive of class as well as ethnicity, and the Spanish kings restricted arms to members of the nobility by virtue of Law 64 of the 1583 Cortes de Tudela and was again reiterated by Law 13 of the 1642 Cortes.

After 1915 Cronistas Reyes de Armas were appointed by the Spanish Ministry of Justice on behalf of the Crown, and have authority to certify armorial bearings to subjects of the Spanish Crown and others as well as being tasked with approving the genealogies of claimants to noble titles. As Cronista de Armas de Castilla y León, appointed by Decree of the Junta de Castilla y León, the 9 of May 1991, published in the Official Bulletin, ranked as Director General (High level State Officer), the marquess continues this tradition being mandated to certify arms and verify family pedigrees.

Marriages and children
Alfonso Ceballos-Escallera was married to Ana Moyano y Vital. They have the following children:
 Angelina de Ceballos-Escalera y Moyano, (b. Madrid, August 1, 1984)
 Antonio de Ceballos-Escalera y Moyano, (b. Madrid, September 16, 1987)
 Ignacio de Ceballos-Escalera y Moyano, (b. Madrid, December 9, 1988)
 María Teresa de Ceballos-Escalera y Moyano, (b. Segovia, March 13, 1994)

He married secondly, María Jofre y Gómez, born on January 28, 1969, in Madrid. By her, he has the following issue:
 Ramiro de Ceballos-Escalera y Jofre, (b. Madrid, March 13, 2002)
 Isabel de Ceballos-Escalera y Jofre, (b. Madrid, January 18, 2005)

See also
 Grandees of Spain
 Académie Belgo-Espagnole d'Histoire

References

External links
Francisco Franco, Decreto del 13 de abril de 1951.
Decreto 105/1991, (Boletín Oficial de Castilla y León de 16 May 1991)
Spanish cronistas
Heraldic authorities
Emiliano González Diez, Félix Martínez Llorente et Francisco Trullén Galve, XXV Aniversario de la creación del cargo y oficio de Cronista de Armas de Castilla y León in Cuadernos de Ayala (Revista de la federación española de genealogía y heráldica y ciencias históricas), Número 66, Abril-Junio 2016. pp. 15-17.

1957 births
Living people
Writers from Madrid
Spanish heraldists
20th-century Spanish historians